Eustis High School is the local high school for the city of Eustis, Florida, United States.  Located at 1300 E Washington Ave Eustis, FL 32726.  Athletic teams are the Panthers. The school is a member of the Lake County Schools district.

Campuses
There are two separate campuses.  The Curtright Campus for freshmen and the main campus for grades 10 through 12.

Athletics
Eustis High has sports teams for male and female students including basketball, baseball, football, swimming, track, volleyball, weightlifting, softball, cross country, and soccer.  Eustis's basketball, softball and baseball programs are top notch and students transfer from local high schools in part to play for the Panthers.  Their football program has been good in the past but it has been struggling since 2007.

Basketball 
(Boy's)

The Eustis High School boys' Basketball team is a member of the 5A District 13 Standings in the State of Florida.

2013
In 2013 the Panther's finished 8–0 in their district and went 23–8 overall.  Although the Panthers had a perfect 8–0 district record in the regular season, they lost 63–61 to Mt Dora High School in the District Championship game.  Eustis would end up losing in the 3rd round of the playoffs to American Heritage who would go on to win the 5A state title a week later.  The Panther's only home loss of the 2013 season came in the 3rd round of the playoffs to American Heritage.  The Panther's lost 52–47.  They ended their year 11–1 at home, 10–4 away and 2–3 at neutral locations.

2014
The Eustis Panthers ended their 2014–15 season in the 3rd round of the playoffs with a 38–49 loss to Cardinal Gibbons at home.  Six days later Cardinal Gibbons beat Gibbs High School (St. Petersburg, FL) in the final four by a score of 73–38.  The following day they won the Florida 5A state championship.  This was the second year in a row that the Panthers lost to the eventual state champion in the playoffs.  Overall the Panthers went 23–7 in the 2014–2015 season giving them an impressive eleven consecutive winning seasons.  The Panthers went 10–3 at home, 9–3 away and 4–1 at neutral sites.  They forced 1827 points and allowed 1440.  Eustis went a perfect 6–0 in their district.  Additionally, they went 2–0 in district tournament play and were titled district champions.

Overall 203–85 (0.705)
Non-District 84–53
District 75–19
Playoffs 16–10
Home 81–25
Away 75–31
Neutral 47–28
In-State 202–85
Out-of-State 1–0

All season records above are from 2005 and after.

The Panthers only out-of-state game was against East Hall High School, Georgia on December 27, 2012.  The Panthers won 83–76.  This is the Panther's only recorded out-of-state game since 2004.  East Hall is a school similar in size to Eustis with 1,100 students and is located just outside Gainesville, Georgia

Baseball 
(Boy's)

In 2010 head Coach David Lee announced he was returning to coach the Panthers in their 2011 season.  Coach Lee led the Panthers to their 2000 State Championship win shortly before retiring from Eustis.  Coach Lee would leave the Panthers to coach Leesburg High School for five years and then led the Apopka Blue Darters until 2010.  Coach Lee has been head coach of the Eustis Panthers for the last six years.  In that time he has compiled a record of 124–43 (.743) along with five district championships and six consecutive seasons with playoff appearances.

2013–14 season
In 2013 Eustis's boys' baseball team finished 20–9 overall and 5–1 in their district.  They were 9–3 at home, 7–3 away and 4–2 at neutral locations.  They scored 143 runs while allowing just 81.  Eustis boys' baseball lost in the 2nd round of the playoffs by a score of 1–2.  They lost to Rockledge who would later lose to the State Runner-up two weeks later.  The Eustis Panther's baseball program has claimed two State Championships in recent history, the first being in 2000 and then a second in 2003.

2014–15 season
In 2014, Eustis won its 5th consecutive district title and finished with a final overall record of 18–8 (6–0 district).  Eustis ended its season ranked 9th in the Florida Class 5A standings.

The Eustis baseball program currently has several players at the Division I level.  Today, Eustis Panthers play at the University of South Florida,  the University of Florida, Clemson University, and Liberty University to name a few.

Football 
Eustis Football Home - Maxpreps
  
Eustis is a notable football team in the regional area, historically speaking.  However, the panthers have been in decline in recent years and haven't had a winning season since 2007.  They have appeared in three state title games (1963, 1965 & 1983).   They have two state championship titles '63 & '83, one state runner-up title and 13 district titles.

Eustis Football Achievements:

Playoff Appearances (22)

1963, 1965, 1966, 1967, 1968, 1970, 1971, 1972, 1983, 1991, 1993, 1994, 1995, 1996, 1997, 2000, 2001, 2002, 2003, 2005, 2006, 2007, 2016

District Titles (13)

1965, 1966, 1967, 1968, 1970, 1971, 1972, 1983, 1991, 1994, 1995, 1997, 2005

Elite Eight (8)

1963, 1965, 1966, 1968, 1971, 1983, 1995, 2006

Final Four (6)

1963, 1965, 1966, 1968, 1971, 1983

State Finals (3)

1963, 1965, 1983

Notable alumni
Joe Burnett, cornerback for the Calgary Stampeders in the Canadian Football League.  Formerly played for the Edmonton Eskimos, Pittsburgh Steelers and New York Giants  College: University of Central Florida
 Rod Ferrell, murderer.
 Anthony Fieldings, former linebacker for the Dallas Cowboys in the National Football League.  College: Morningside College
 Chris Okey, 2nd round pick (43rd overall) in the 2016 MLB draft & catcher for Cincinnati Reds. College: Clemson Tigers
 John Robert Schrieffer, recipient of 1972 Nobel Prize in Physics.
 David Walker, former NASA astronaut and US Navy Pilot
 Richard Williams, former running back for the Atlanta Falcons and Houston Oilers in the National Football League. College: Memphis Tigers

Eustis has had athletes from their baseball, softball, basketball, and football programs go on to play for multiple schools at the Division 1 level including; Florida (baseball, basketball & football), Florida State (football), Central Florida (football, volleyball, and softball), Kansas State (football), Vanderbilt (football) and Clemson (baseball).

References

External links
 Official website
 EHS Sports Homes

Educational institutions in the United States with year of establishment missing
Eustis, Florida
High schools in Lake County, Florida
Public high schools in Florida